Zehra Doğan (born May 30, 2001) is a Turkish Muay Thai, Kickboxer. She is IFMA and WAKO former world champion and the current WBC Muaythai world and Muay Ying flyweight champion. Doğan ranked #4 in the WMO flyweight rankings.

Early life 
Doğan started sports at a young age under the supervision of her father, who is a retired taekwondo practitioner, and with her two other sisters Zeliha and Sevgi. When she saw the success of her sister, she became more interested in professional sports and after 2 years of starting martial arts, she won world championship medal.

Career

IFMA 
In 2014 and 2017, Doğan was able to win the gold and bronze medal of the IFMA World Muay Thai Championship. In 2016, she also won the Gold Medal of the IFMA European Muay Thai Championship.

WAKO 
Between the years 2019 and 2021, Doğan was able to win the gold medals of the European, International, World and World Cup of WAKO Kickboxing championships.

RWS 
Doğan participated in the first Rajadamnern World Series (RWS) league as one of 4 foreign women fighters along with 4 Thai fighters. This was the first time after 70 years since the foundation of Rajadamnern stadium that female fighters made history and entered the ring of this stadium. On December 23, 2022, She lost to Somratsamee Chaisuya by split decision in the final.

WBC Muay Thai 
On February 5, 2023, Doğan defend Gabrielel Batista by split decision and win the WBC Muay Thai world and Muay Ying title. She is the first and only Turkish fighter who owns this title.

Titles and accomplishments 
Amateur

 International Federation of Muaythai Associations
  2014 IFMA 45 kg World Championship
  2016 IFMA 54 kg Europe Championship
  2017 IFMA 54 kg World Championship
 World Association of Kickboxing Organizations
  2019 WAKO 52 kg International Championship
  2019 WAKO 52 kg Europe Championship
  2020 WAKO 48 kg International Championship
  2021 WAKO 48 kg International Championship
  2021 WAKO 48 kg Europe Championship
  2021 WAKO 48 kg World Championship
  2022 WAKO 52 kg World Cup

Professional

 World Boxing Council Muaythai
 2023 WBC Muay Thai -50.802 kg World Championship
 2023 WBC Muay Thai -50.802 kg Muay Ying Championship

Fight record 

|- style="background:#cfc" 
| 2023-02-05 ||Win||align=left| Gabriele Batista || Amazing Muay Thai Festival
 || Hua Hin, Thailand || Decision (split) || 5 || 2:00
|-
! style=background:white colspan=9 |

|- style="background:#fbb" 
| 2022-12-23 ||Loss||align=left| Somratsamee Chaisuya || Rajadamnern World Series - Final
 || Bangkok, Thailand || Decision (split) || 5 || 2:00
|-
! style=background:white colspan=9 |

|- style="background:#cfc" 
| 2022-11-25 ||Win||align=left| Aida Looksaikongdin || Rajadamnern World Series - Semi final
 || Bangkok, Thailand || Decision (unanimous) || 3 || 2:00

|- style="background:#fbb" 
| 2022-10-21 ||Loss||align=left| Somratsamee Chaisuya || Rajadamnern World Series
 || Bangkok, Thailand || Decision (unanimous) || 3 || 2:00

|- style="background:#cfc" 
| 2022-09-16 ||Win||align=left| Desiree Rovira || Rajadamnern World Series
 || Bangkok, Thailand || KO (right hook) || 1 || 0:28

|- style="background:#cfc" 
| 2022-08-12 ||Win||align=left| Petchnamnueng Fairtex || Rajadamnern World Series
 || Bangkok, Thailand || Decision (unanimous)  || 3 || 2:00

|- style="background:#fbb" 
| 2022-07-02 ||Loss||align=left| Fateme Yavari || Karabag Zafer Gecesi
 || Baku, Azerbaijan|| Decision (unanimous)  || 3 || 3:00

|- style="background:#cfc" 
| 2022-03-15 ||Win||align=left| Karmen Tsavdiridi || Ringin Sultanlari
 || Istanbul, Turkey|| Decision (unanimous)  || 3 || 3:00

|- style="background:#cfc" 
| 2017-10-30 ||Win||align=left| Seher Inci || Republic Cup || Mersin, Turkey|| KO (high kick)  || 1 || 1:00

|- style="background:#cfc" 
| 2016-02-02 ||Win||align=left| N/A || Arena of Legends Muay Thai
 || Istanbul, Turkey|| KO (high kick)  || 1 ||

|-
| colspan=9 | Legend:    

|- style="background:#cfc;"
|2021-10-22
|Win
| align="left" | Doktugu Diana
|2021 WAKO World Championships - Final
|Jesolo, Italy
|KO (high kick)
|1
|
|-
! style=background:white colspan=9 |
|- style="background:#cfc;"
|2021-10-22
|Win
| align="left" | Maria Eduardo
|2021 WAKO World Championships - Semi final
|Jesolo, Italy
|Decision (3-0)
|3
|3:00
|-
|-
|- style="background:#cfc;"
|2021-10-22
|Win
| align="left" | Mihajlovic Milana
|2021 WAKO World Championships - Quarter final

|Jesolo, Italy
|Decision (3-0)
|3
|3:00
|-
|-
|- style="background:#cfc;"
|2019-08-31
|Win
| align="left" | Kristina Malikova
|2019 WAKO European Championships - Final

|Győr, Hungry
|Decision (3-0)
|3
|3:00
|-
|-
! style=background:white colspan=9 |
|- style="background:#cfc;"
|2019-08-31
|Win
| align="left" | Daria Zhiltsova
|2019 WAKO European Championships - Semi final

|Győr, Hungry
|Decision (3-0)
|3
|3:00
|-
|-
|- style="background:#cfc;"
|2018-08-06
|Win
| align="left" | Wraphon Jaiteang
|2018 IFMA Youth World Muay Thai Championships

|Bangkok, Thailand
|Decision (2-1)
|3
|3:00
|-
|-
|- style="background:#cfc;"
|2017-08-14
|Win
| align="left" | Mykayla Robert
|2017 IFMA Youth World Muay Thai Championships - Semi final

|Bangkok, Thailand
|KO (knee)
|1
|
|-
|-
|- style="background:#cfc;"
|2017-08-12
|Win
| align="left" | Sani Nurminen 
|2017 IFMA Youth World Muay Thai Championships - Quarter final
|Bangkok, Thailand
|Decision (3-0)
|3
|3:00
|-
|-
|- style="background:#cfc;"
|2014-05-09
|Win
| align="left" | Hannah Bradicich 
|2014 IFMA Youth World Muay Thai Championships - Final
|Langkawi, Malaysia
|Decision (3-0)
|3
|3:00
|-
|-
! style=background:white colspan=9 |
|- style="background:white"
| colspan=9 | Legend:

See also 

 List of WBC Muaythai female world champions
 List of female kickboxers
 List of Muay Thai practitioners
 Venum

References

External links 

 

2001 births
Living people
Zehra Doğan
Zehra Doğan
Zehra Doğan
People from Osmaniye
21st-century Turkish women
Turkish female kickboxers
Turkish female martial artists